Giertsen is a surname. Notable people with the surname include:

Per Giertsen (1906–1990), Norwegian physician and resistance member
Robert Giertsen (1894–1978), Norwegian sailor 
Thomas Giertsen (born 1971), Norwegian producer, stand-up comedian, and actor 

Norwegian-language surnames